The ZLM Tour was a cycling race held annually between 1996 and 2019 in Goes and its surroundings, in the Dutch province of Zeeland. From 2008 to 2018, it was held as part of the UCI Under 23 Nations' Cup, and as such, was contested by national teams. In 2019, the race was known as the Grote Prijs Arjaan de Schipper, with the ZLM Tour nomenclature moving to the former Ster ZLM Toer.

Winners

References

External links

Recurring sporting events established in 1996
1996 establishments in the Netherlands
Recurring sporting events disestablished in 2019
2019 disestablishments in the Netherlands
Cycle races in the Netherlands
Cycling in Zeeland
Sport in Goes